Wagoner High School is a high school in Wagoner, Oklahoma.

Notable alumni
Kevin Peterson, American football player

References

External links
 Official Website

Public high schools in Oklahoma
Schools in Wagoner County, Oklahoma